Ignis (Latin for fire) may refer to:
 Ignis (album), a 2000 album by Paul Giger
 Ignis Asset Management
 Ignis (cycling team), an Italian professional cycling team that existed from 1955 to 1968
 Ignis Scientia, a major character in the Final Fantasy XV subseries
 Suzuki Ignis, a subcompact car produced 2000–2008 and 2016–present
 Roggero Musmeci Ferrari Bravo (1868 – 1937), an Italian writer with the pen name ignis